New Zealand at the 1958 British Empire and Commonwealth Games was represented by a team of 66 competitors and 11 officials. Selection of the team for the Games in Cardiff, Wales, was the responsibility of the New Zealand Olympic and British Empire Games Association. New Zealand's flagbearer at the opening ceremony was javelin thrower Malcolm Hahn.  The New Zealand team finished fifth on the medal table, winning a total of 19 medals, four of which were gold.

New Zealand has competed in every games, starting with the British Empire Games in 1930 at Hamilton, Ontario.

Medal tables

New Zealand was fifth in the medal table in 1958, with a total of 19 medals, including four gold.

Competitors
The following table lists the number of New Zealand competitors participating at the Games according to gender and sport.

Athletics

Track and road

Field

Boxing

Cycling

Road
Men's road race

Track
Men's 1000 m sprint

Men's 1 km time trial

Men's 4000 m individual pursuit

Men's 10 miles scratch race

Diving

Fencing

Men

Individual épée

Individual foil

Individual sabre

Team events

Women
Individual foil

Lawn bowls

Rowing

Swimming

Weightlifting

Wrestling

See also
New Zealand Olympic Committee
New Zealand at the Commonwealth Games
New Zealand at the 1956 Summer Olympics
New Zealand at the 1960 Summer Olympics

External links
NZOC website on the 1958 games
Commonwealth Games Federation website
Athletes in the 1966 Encyclopaedia of New Zealand has a paragraph on these Games

1958
British Empire and Commonwealth Games
Nations at the 1958 British Empire and Commonwealth Games